In the mathematical discipline of graph theory, the n-barbell graph is a special type of undirected graph consisting of two non-overlapping n-vertex cliques together with a single edge that has an endpoint in each clique.

See also
 Lollipop graph
 Tadpole graph

References

Parametric families of graphs